Lower Coombe and Ferne Brook Meadows is an 11.34 hectare biological Site of Special Scientific Interest in Wiltshire, England which sits on the Upper Greensand and Gault Clay. The site is home to rare fen meadow and neutral grassland communities in an unimproved grassland. Species such as Triglochin palustris, Caltha palustris and Oenanthe pimpinelloides can be found at the location. Three streams, which form headwaters of the River Nadder flow through the site. It was  notified in 2002.

References

External links
 Natural England website (SSSI information)

Sites of Special Scientific Interest in Wiltshire
Sites of Special Scientific Interest notified in 2002
Meadows in Wiltshire